The Vasquez Peak Wilderness is a U.S. Wilderness Area located southwest of Winter Park, Colorado. The  wilderness established in 1993 in the Arapaho and Roosevelt national forests has  of trails.

References

Wilderness areas of Colorado
Protected areas established in 1993
Protected areas of Grand County, Colorado
Arapaho National Forest
Roosevelt National Forest